Elgin Museum could refer to:

The Elgin Public Museum in Elgin, Illinois, USA
The Elgin Museum (Moray) in Elgin, Moray, Scotland
The Elgin Museum (Oregon) in Elgin, Oregon, USA
The Elgin Military Museum in St. Thomas, Ontario, Canada
The Elgin Museum (North Dakota) in Elgin, North Dakota